The 1943 Australian federal election was held in Australia on 21 August 1943. All 74 seats in the House of Representatives and 19 of the 36 seats in the Senate were up for election. The incumbent Labor Party, led by Prime Minister John Curtin, defeated the opposition Country–UAP coalition led by Arthur Fadden in a landslide.

Fadden, the leader of the Country Party, was serving as Leader of the Opposition despite the Country Party holding fewer seats in parliament than the United Australia Party (UAP). He was previously the Prime Minister in August 1941, after he was chosen by the coalition parties to lead the government after the forced resignation of Prime Minister Robert Menzies, the UAP leader. However, he stayed in office for only six weeks before the two independents who held the balance of power joined Labor in voting down his budget. Governor-General Lord Gowrie was reluctant to call an election for a parliament barely a year old, especially considering the international situation.  At his urging, the independents threw their support to Labor for the remainder of the parliamentary term.

Over the next two years, Curtin proved to be a very popular and effective leader, and the Coalition was unable to get the better of him.  A number of groups also split away from the UAP prior to the election, the most prominent of which was the Liberal Democratic Party (LDP). Labor thus went into the election in a commanding position, and flipped 13 seats on a 7.9% swing, winning 50.2% of the primary vote and 58.2% of the two-party preferred vote. 

The Coalition was reduced to 23 seats, including only nine for the Country Party. Notably, Labor won every seat in Western Australia and all but one in South Australia: Archie Cameron, the member for Barker in South Australia, was left as the only Coalition MP outside the eastern states. The LDP did not win any seats.

This election was significant in the fact that it resulted in the election of the first female member of the House of Representatives, the UAP's Enid Lyons for Darwin, Tasmania, and the first female Senator, Labor's Dorothy Tangney, in Western Australia. The election also remains Labor's greatest federal victory in terms of proportion of seats and two-party votes in the lower house, and primary vote in the Senate as of 2022.

The lack of effective opposition to the Labor party in the lead up to and following the election became the catalyst for the creation of the Liberal Party of Australia from the ashes of the UAP, and for George Cole, Keith Murdoch and other big business magnates to form the conservative think tank the Institute of Public Affairs.

This was the last major election that did not involve the current Liberal and Labor Party competition.

Results

House of Representatives

{{Australian elections/Title row
| table style=float:right;clear:right;margin-left:1em;
| title = Australian federal election, 21 August 1943
| house = House of Representatives

| series = Australian federal election
| back = 1940
| forward = 1946
| enrolled =  4,466,749
| total_votes = 4,249,369
| turnout % = 95.13
| turnout chg = +1.27
| informal = 148,785
| informal % = 3.50
| informal chg = +0.95
}}

|}

Senate

Seats changing hands

 *Oliver Badman and Archie Cameron ran as candidates for the UAP.

See also
 Candidates of the Australian federal election, 1943
 Members of the Australian House of Representatives, 1943–1946
 Members of the Australian Senate, 1944–1947

Notes
Notes

Citations

References

University of WA  election results in Australia since 1890
Two-party-preferred vote since 1937

Federal elections in Australia
1943 elections in Australia
August 1943 events
Landslide victories